50 Years 50 Stars is a television special that marked 50 years of television in Australia. Hosted by Mike Munro and broadcast on Sunday 10 September 2006 on the Nine Network, the special counted down the top 50 greatest living Australian television personalities.

Also in the special featured many special comments from other television personalities, including Charles 'Bud' Tingwell, John Wood, Erik Thomson, Bert Newton, Jacki Weaver, Scott Cam, James Brayshaw, Jules Lund, Livinia Nixon, Steve Vizard, Ray Martin, Tracy Grimshaw, Brian Henderson, Giaan Rooney, Kimberley Davies & Jana Wendt.

# Bert Newton
# Kath & Kim
# Garry McDonald
# Paul Hogan
# Don Lane
# Kylie Minogue
# Barry Humphries
# John Farnham
# John Wood
# Olivia Newton-John
# Magda Szubanski
# Eddie McGuire
# Andrew Denton
# Ian 'Molly' Meldrum
# Daryl Somers
# Mike Willesee
# Rove McManus
# Sigrid Thornton
# Eric Bana
# Jana Wendt
# Lisa McCune
# Charles 'Bud' Tingwell
# Noeline Brown
# John Clarke
# Mike Walsh
# Stuart Wagstaff
# Georgie Parker
# Don Burke
# Reg Grundy
# Richie Benaud
# Ray Martin
# Rebecca Gibney
# Nicole Kidman
# Brian Henderson
# Claudia Karvan
# George Negus
# Denise Drysdale
# Glenn Robbins
# Rob Sitch
# Michael Caton
# Jacki Weaver
# Lorraine Bayly
# Kerri-Anne Kennerley
# Ossie Ostrich
# Bec Cartwright/Hewitt
# Toni Lamond
# Mark Mitchell
# Jack Thompson
# Roy and HG
# Delta Goodrem

See also
 List of Australian television series
 50 Years 50 Shows

External links
 Nine Network press release as published on the Australian TV Guide.
 ninemsn video

2006 in Australian television
Nine Network specials
Australian non-fiction television series
Lists of mass media in Australia
Australian television specials
2000s Australian television series